The 2013 FIBA Europe Under-18 Championship was the 30th edition of the FIBA Europe Under-18 Championship. 16 teams participated in the competition, held in Latvia, from 18 to 28 July 2013. Croatia were the defending champions. Turkey became the new champions, taking their first title.

Participating teams
  (Winners, 2012 FIBA Europe Under-18 Championship Division B)

  (Runners-up, 2012 FIBA Europe Under-18 Championship Division B)
  (3rd place, 2012 FIBA Europe Under-18 Championship Division B)

First round
The first-round groups draw took place on 8 December 2012 in Freising, Germany. In the first round, the sixteen teams were allocated in four groups of four teams each. The top three teams of each group qualified for the Second Round. The last team of each group played in the Classification Group G first, then in the 9th–16th place playoffs.

Times below are in CEST (UTC+2).

Group A

|}

Group B

|}

Group C

|}

Group D

|}

Second round
Twelve advancing teams from the First Round were allocated in two groups of six teams each. The top four teams of each group advanced to the quarterfinals. The last two teams of each group played for the 9th–16th place against the teams from the Group G.

Group E

|}

Group F

|}

Classification Group G
The last team of each group of the First Round competed in this Classification Round.

|}

Classification playoffs for 9th – 16th place

Classification games for 9th – 16th place

Classification games for 13th – 16th place

Classification games for 9th – 12th place

1st – 8th Place Playoff

5–8th place bracket

Quarterfinals

Semifinals

Classification games for 5th – 8th place

Final classification games

Match for 15th place

Match for 13th place

Match for 11th place

Match for 9th place

Match for 7th place

Match for 5th place

Bronze medal match

Final

Final standings

Awards 

All-Tournament Team

 Kenan Sipahi
 Paolo Marinelli
 Domagoj Bošnjak
 Kristaps Porziņģis
 Anžejs Pasečņiks

References

External links
FIBA European U-18 Championship

FIBA U18 European Championship
2013–14 in European basketball
2013–14 in Latvian basketball
International youth basketball competitions hosted by Latvia